Killing Zone is a fighting video game developed by Scarab and published by Naxat Soft in March 1996 in Japan and by Acclaim in both July 1996 in North America, and September 1996 in Europe and Oceania, for the Sony PlayStation platform. The game was met with a poor critical reception.

Gameplay

In this sequel to Sega Saturn's Battle Monsters, there are a total of 14 characters in the game, and two modes: Normal Mode which is a standard fighting game mode, and Auto Mode. In Auto mode the player selects a type of monster, making their own version of one of the seven playable characters. Auto mode comprises three tournaments, during which the player can upgrade their monster by winning battles. Unlike the 2D digitized actors and platforms of its predecessor, the gameplay is more like Virtua Fighter in terms of 3D characters, move sets and ring outs.

Development
The development team's more ambitious unrealized plans for the game included allowing characters to dismember their opponents during fights.

Critical reception

Killing Zone received mostly negative reviews. Next Generation panned it, citing animation "among the worst we've seen", counter-intuitive controls, disorienting camera movements, poor enemy AI, and overpowered enemies. They remarked that "To call this game frustrating is to give the most unbearably frustrating games a bad name." The game was deemed "awful" by IGN, who repeated nearly all of Next Generations points.

Legacy
In October 2018, the game's rights were acquired by Canadian production company Liquid Media Group along with other titles originally owned by Acclaim Entertainment.

See also
List of fighting games

References

1996 video games
Acclaim Entertainment games
Kaga Create games
PlayStation (console) games
PlayStation (console)-only games
Multiplayer and single-player video games
Fighting games
Video games developed in Japan